Waldegg Castle is a castle near Solothurn, but in the municipality of Feldbrunnen-St. Niklaus of the Canton of Solothurn in Switzerland.  It is a Swiss heritage site of national significance.

History
The Baroque castle was built in 1682–86 as the summer home for Schultheiss Johann Viktor von Besenval (1638–1713) and his wife Maria Margaritha von Sury (1649–1713).

His son, Johann Viktor II (1671–1736) was a diplomat and an officer in the French Swiss Guards.  After he inherited the castle he had it renovated (1729–34), adding a theater and the chapel of St. Michael, and decorated in the current French style.  He brought numerous works of art back with him from France.

Johann Viktor II's son, Baron Peter Viktor von Besenval (1721–1791) was born at the castle.  However, he lived most of his life in France.  He did, however, add an orangery to the castle in 1780.  The French Revolution of 1789 was disastrous to the family's influence, business interests and wealth.  While they were able to escape to Switzerland, their close ties to the old nobility made them unwelcome in France.  When the Besenval family died out, the castle was abandoned until it was purchased by Joseph von Sury von Besenval in 1865.  The new owner added two apartments and changed the Baroque garden into an English garden.

In 1963 the castle was transferred to the Waldegg Castle Foundation and in 1975 it became the headquarters of the Center for Intercultural Dialogue, an organization that fosters understanding between the different languages and cultures of Switzerland.  Beginning in 1985 it was extensively renovated and repaired, a project that lasted twenty years.  The castle museum opened in 1991.

Castle site

The castle was built in the local Turmlihaus style, but incorporating elements of the French and Italian Baroque.  The central building features three large towers and is flanked by symmetric, two story tall galleries with corner turrets.  Niches in the galleries house allegorical statues which were carved in 1683 by Johann Peter Frölicher.  The eastern turret houses the castle chapel with a high-Baroque altar from 1720.  The second chapel has reproductions of St. Michael by Raphael and St Raphael by Domenico Fetti, the originals of which both hang in the Louvre.  The main hall has ten allegorical paintings of the Arts and Sciences and is decorated with supraporte and trompe-l'œil illusions.  The eastern salon has a grisaille style ceiling painting while the west salon and billiard rooms both have trompe-l'œil illusions painted on the ceiling.

See also
 List of castles in Switzerland

References

Cultural property of national significance in the canton of Solothurn
Castles in the canton of Solothurn